Tianquan County is a county of Sichuan Province, China. It is under the administration of Ya'an City. In 1950, the county bore witness to the Battle of Tianquan, which resulted in the communists defeating the nationalists.

Climate

References

County-level divisions of Sichuan